Anton Olsen, Olsen or Olsson may refer to:

 Anton Olsen (Medal of Honor) (1873–1924), United States Navy quartermaster who received the Medal of Honor
 Anton Olsen (rifle shooter) (1897–1968), Norwegian rifle shooter
Anton Olson (1881–?), Swedish chess master
Anton Olsson, character in th3 1973 film Anton